Gibberula oryza is a species of very small sea snail, a marine gastropod mollusk or micromollusk in the family Cystiscidae. It is considered a delicacy for those of various cultures in the Philippines.

Description

Distribution

References

Cystiscidae
Gastropods described in 1822